Yelena Sergeyevna Korobkina (born 25 November 1990) is a Russian distance runner who competes in events from 1500 metres to 10,000 metres. She won the silver medal in the 1500 metres at the 2013 Summer Universiade in Kazan.

International competitions

References

External links

1990 births
Living people
Place of birth missing (living people)
Russian female middle-distance runners
Universiade gold medalists in athletics (track and field)
Universiade gold medalists for Russia
Universiade silver medalists for Russia
Medalists at the 2013 Summer Universiade
World Athletics Championships athletes for Russia
European Athletics Indoor Championships winners
Russian Athletics Championships winners
20th-century Russian women
21st-century Russian women